The Office of the Attorney General of the Republic of Indonesia (Indonesian: Kejaksaan Agung Republik Indonesia) is the competent authority to advise the Government of Indonesia on matters of law. It serves as the central organization for the Indonesian Public Prosecution Service (Kejaksaan Republik Indonesia). The Attorney General's Office is seated in the national capital Jakarta. 

The Office is headed by the Attorney General of Indonesia, who have the authority to represent the government at the Supreme Court of Indonesia and is a Cabinet-level official. The Office is not part of any justice portfolio or the Judiciary, however, as the cabinet has its own Ministry of Law and Human Rights  (Kementerian Hukum dan Hak Asasi Manusia) with a separate Minister of Law and Human Rights (Menteri Hukum dan Hak Asasi Manusia) that focuses on more technical matters and regulatory role making rather than executing the Supreme Court's order. 

The Attorney-General also functions as a Solicitor General. Thus, the Attorney-General can represent the Government in the Supreme Court. The Attorney-General has the power to indict and prosecute alleged criminals. The term of office of the Attorney General was determined by the Constitutional Court of Indonesia in 2010 to be concurrent with the term of office of the President of Indonesia. The current Attorney General of Indonesia Sanitiar Burhanuddin, who assumed office in October 2019.

Organization 
The Attorney-General's Office headed the entire Indonesian Public Prosecution Service, with a nation-wide jurisdiction. Subordinated directly under it is the Office of the High Prosecutors, based in the provincial capital, with province-wide jurisdiction.

Leadership elements 

 Attorney General (Jaksa Agung), heads the Indonesian Public Prosecution Service, guide the Service's duties and authorities.
 Vice Attorney General (Wakil Jaksa Agung), assists the Attorney General, represents the Attorney General in their absence, and execute other duties tasked by the Attorney General.

Leadership support elements 

 Deputy Attorney General on Guidance Affairs (Jaksa Agung Muda Bidang Pembinaan), which oversee planning, procurement and construction, organization management, human resources, finances, state assets management, legal opinions, legal drafting, international cooperation, public service, and other technical supports. The office is assisted by several subordinate units:
 Guidance Affairs Secretariat;   
 Bureau of Planning;   
 Bureau of General Affairs;   
 Bureau of Human Resource;   
 Bureau of Finance;   
 Bureau of Facilities; and   
 Bureau of Legal and International Affairs.   
 Deputy Attorney General on Intelligence Affairs (Jaksa Agung Muda Bidang Intelijen), which oversee intelligence of investigations, security, promotion to prevent and repress crime, travel bans, and public peace and order. The office is assisted by several subordinate units:
 Intelligence Affairs Secretariat;  
 Directorate on Ideology, Political, Defense, and Security Affairs;  
 Directorate on Social, Cultural, and Public Affairs;  
 Directorate on Economic and Financial Affairs;  
 Directorate on Strategic Development Security Affairs; and  
 Directorate on IT and Intelligence Production.  
 Deputy Attorney General on General Criminal Affairs (Jaksa Agung Muda Bidang Tindak Pidana Umum), which oversee pretrials, additional investigations, indictments, legal actions, executions of court orders and sentencing, examinations and observations over paroles and other legal actions of general crimes. The office is assisted by several subordinate units:
 General Criminal Affairs Secretariat;
 Directorate on Crimes Against Persons and Property;
 Directorate on Crimes Against State Security, Public Order, and Other General Crimes;
 Directorate on Crimes Involving Narcotics and Other Addictive Substances; and
 Directorate on Terrorism and Transnational Crimes.
 Deputy Attorney General on Special Criminal Affairs (Jaksa Agung Muda Bidang Tindak Pidana Khusus), which oversee investigations, pre-indictments, additional investigations, indictments, legal actions, executions of court orders and sentencing examinations and observations over paroles and other legal actions of special crimes. The office is assisted by several subordinate units:
 Special Criminal Affairs Secretariat;
 Directorate on Investigation;
 Directorate on Prosecution;
 Directorate on Extraordinary Legal Actions, Executions, and Examinations; and
 Directorate on Grave Violation of Basic Human Rights.
 Deputy Attorney General on Civil and State Administrative Affairs (Jaksa Agung Muda Bidang Perdata dan Tata Usaha Negara), which oversee law enforcement, legal assistance, legal opinions, and other legal actions toward the state or the government, which includes state institutions, central and regional government institutions, state- and regional-owned enterprises in civil and state administration cases, in order to secure and restore national assets and wealth, protect state and government honor, and provide public legal assistance. The office is assisted by several subordinate units:
 Civil and State Administrative Affairs Secretariat;  
 Directorate on Civil Affairs;  
 Directorate on State Administrative Affairs; and  
 Directorate on Legal Consideration.  
 Deputy Attorney General on Military Criminal Affairs (Jaksa Agung Muda Bidang Pidana Militer), which oversee technical cooperation for the purpose of indictments of military personnel with the military prosecutors (Oditurat), as well as on the civil-military judicial connection affairs. The office is assisted by several subordinate units:
 Military Criminal Affairs Secretariat;
 Directorate on Military Justice Enforcement;
 Directorate on Prosecution; and
 Directorate on Executions, Extraordinary Legal Actions, and Examinations
 Deputy Attorney General on Oversight (Jaksa Agung Muda Bidang Pengawasan), which oversee planning, execution, and control of oversight  over the Service's performance and internal finances, and oversight duties over certain matters by the Attorney General's orders. The office is assisted by several subordinate units:
 Oversight Affairs Secretariat;
 Inspectorate I oversees the Education and Training Agency, as well as the High Prosecutors' Office of Aceh, North Sumatra, Riau, Yogyakarta, West Kalimantan, and West Nusa Tenggara;
 Inspectorate II oversees the Deputy Attorney General on Intelligence and on Special Criminal Affairs, as well as the High Prosecutors' Office of South Sumatra, Jambi, West Sumatra, Jakarta, Central Kalimantan, East Nusa Tenggara, and Papua;
 Inspectorate III oversees the Deputy Attorney General on General Criminal Affairs and on Civil and State Administrative Affairs, as well as the High Prosecutors' Office of West Java, East Kalimantan, Riau Islands, Lampung, Gorontalo, and Maluku;
 Inspectorate IV oversees the Research and Development Center, Legal Information Center, Data, Crime Statistics, and Information Technology Center, and Asset Recovery Center, as well as the High Prosecutors' Office of Central Java, South Sulawesi, Central Sulawesi, South Kalimantan, Bali, and Bangka-Belitung;
 Inspectorate V oversees the Deputy Attorney General on Guidance Affairs, as well as the High Prosecutors' Office of East Java, North Sulawesi, Southeast Sulawesi, Bengkulu, Banten, and North Maluku; and
 Inspectorate on Finance, oversees the financial affairs in all units.
 Education and Training Agency (Badan Pendidikan dan Pelatihan), which oversee prosecutors' professional education and training.
 Advisors to the Attorney General (Staf Ahli), who advice the Attorney General over matters of expertise.
 Central Agencies (Pusat), which consists of:
 Research and Development Center (Pusat Penelitian dan Pengembangan);
 Legal Information Center (Pusat Penerangan Hukum);
 Data, Crime Statistics, and Information Technology Center (Pusat Data, Statistik Kriminal, dan Teknologi Informasi); and
 Asset Recovery Center (Pusat Pemulihan Aset).

List of attorneys general of Indonesia

Buildings of the attorney general's office 

The Attorney General's Office began at a time when the authority to prosecute and to adjudicate were unseparated. Its first office were shared with  the first Supreme Court building complex in 2-4 Lapangan Banteng Timur street, nearby the Waterloosplein (now Lapangan Banteng, Jakarta). The building were previously used as the Hoggerechtshof te Batavia (an appellate court named the High Court of Batavia, now High Court of Jakarta), and currently it is occupied and managed by the Ministry of Finance, who also occupied and managed the Paleis van Daendels building next door. 

The Hoggerechtshof building that were designed by architect Ir. Tramp and completed in 1825 during governor general Du Bus' tenure, were initially used as the headquarters of the Governors General of the Dutch East Indies. Then on 1 May 1848, the building were used by the recently established Departement van Justitie (Department of Justice), which oversaw the court system and the administration of justice in the colony. Sometimes later, the classical style building with six pillars on the front were fully used as the Hoggerechtshof, which included the prosecutor's office.

Throughout the early Indonesian independence period, the prosecutor's office remained attached to the court in Jakarta, which through the Government Edict No. 9/1946, established Jakarta — and by extension the Hoggerechtshof building — as the seat of the Indonesian Supreme Court. Through the 1947 Act on the Organization and Authority of the Supreme Court and the Attorney General's Office, it reaffirmed the relation between the supreme court and the attorney general's office.

Later with the promulgation of the 1961 Public Prosecution Service Act, the attorney general's office were separated from the supreme court. In 1968 during the tenure of Attorney General Soegih Arto, the Office were moved out from the Supreme Court building to a site in 1 Sultan Hassanuddin street in Kebayoran Baru, which is its current site. 

On 22 August 2020, the main building of the Attorney General's office complex caught on fire, and are still under renovation.

References

Government of Indonesia